The Iron Range Historical Society is an historical society that operates a research library in McKinley, Minnesota. The society is a non-profit organization that exists through donations and volunteers. Its mission is "to collect, preserve, and share the history of Minnesota’s Iron Ranges for the benefit of future generations."

The Iron Range Historical Society was incorporated in 1973. Prior to relocating to McKinley, the society was located in Gilbert, Biwabik and Aurora.

The Iron Range Historical Society has a collection of more than 20,000 photographs in 80 albums, in addition to old newspapers and directories of people who lived in the larger Iron Range cities dating from 1899 until recent times. Other artifacts on site and in storage include books, photo displays, and office machinery, vintage clothing, logging and mining artifacts, and other material of archeological, geological or historical significance.

The Iron Range Historical Society publishes four newsletters annually entitled Range Reminiscing, in addition to other publications. The organization is also responsible for the oversight of several off-premises attractions. One of these, the Longyear Drill Site, has recently completed renovation. The Iron Range Historical Society also made efforts in 1976 to save the last remaining smokestack at the Corsica Mine near Elcor, Minnesota. Architecturally significant, it was built by Cornish miners in 1901 and was the last of its kind on the Iron Range. In 2010, the Iron Range Historical Society was awarded a Legacy Grant from the Minnesota Historical Society to broaden accessibility to their newspaper records, and a grant from the Eveleth Area Community Foundation for the publication of their 2015 book Iron Range Ghost Locations.

The Iron Range Historical Society is located in the McKinley Village Hall at 5454 Grand Avenue in McKinley, Minnesota. The future of the Iron Range Historical Society was in question for a time due to the sale of its previous location in the old Gilbert City Hall.

References

External links 
Iron Range Historical Society Website

Cornish-American culture in Minnesota
Historical societies in Minnesota
History museums in Minnesota
Mining museums in Minnesota
Museums in St. Louis County, Minnesota
Research libraries in the United States